Iroquois-class homeodomain protein IRX-1, also known as Iroquois homeobox protein 1, is a protein that in humans is encoded by the IRX1 gene. All members of the Iroquois (IRO) family of proteins share two highly conserved features, encoding both a homeodomain and a characteristic IRO sequence motif. Members of this family are known to play numerous roles in early embryo patterning. IRX1 has also been shown to act as a tumor suppressor gene in several forms of cancer.

Role in development 

IRX1 is a member of the Iroquois homeobox gene family. Members of this family play multiple roles during pattern formation in embryos of numerous vertebrate and invertebrate species. IRO genes are thought to function early in development to define large territories, and again later in development for further patterning specification. Experimental data suggest roles for IRX1 in vertebrates may include development and patterning of lungs, limbs, heart, eyes, and nervous system.

Gene

Overview 

IRX1 is located on the forward DNA strand (see Sense (molecular biology)) of chromosome 5, from position 3596054 - 3601403 at the 5p15.3 location. The human gene product is a 1858 base pair mRNA with 4 predicted exons in humans. Promoter analysis was performed using El Dorado through the Genomatix software page. The predicted promoter region spans 1040 base pairs from position 3595468 through 3595468 on the forward strand of chromosome 5.

Gene neighborhood 

IRX1 is relatively isolated, with no other protein coding genes found from position 3177835 – 5070004.

Expression 

Microarray and RNA seq data suggest that IRX1 is ubiquitously expressed at low levels in adult tissues, with the highest relative levels of expression occurring in the heart, adipose, kidney, and breast tissues. Moderate to high levels are also indicated in the lung, prostate and stomach. Promoter analysis with the El Dorado program from Genomatix predicted that IRX1 expression is regulated by factors that include E2F cell cycle regulators, NRF1, and ZF5, and brachyury. Expression data from human, mouse, and developing mouse brains are available though the Allen Brain Atlas.

Protein

Properties & characteristics 
The mature IRX1 protein has 480 amino acid residues, with a molecular mass of 49,600 Daltons and an isoelectric point of 5.7. A BLAST search revealed that IRX1 contains two highly conserved domains: a homeodomain and a characteristic IRO motif of unknown function. The homeodomain belongs to the TALE (three amino acid loop extension) class of homeodomains, and is characterized by the addition of three extra amino acids between the first and second helix of three alpha helices that comprise the domain. The presence of this well characterized homeodomain strongly suggests that IRX1 acts as a transcription factor. This is further supported by the predicted localization of IRX1 to the nucleus. The IRO motif is a region downstream of the homeodomain that is found only in members of the Iroquois-class homeodomain proteins, though its function is poorly understood. However, its similarity to an internal region of the Notch receptor protein suggests that it may be involved with protein-protein interaction. In addition to these two characteristic domains, IRX1 contains a third domain from the HARE-HTH superfamily fused to the C-terminal end of the homeodomain. This domain adopts a winged helix-turn-helix fold predicted to bind DNA, and is thought to play a role in recruiting effector activities to DNA. Several forms of post-translational modification are predicted, including SUMOylation, C-mannosylation, and phosphorylation, using bioinformatics tools from ExPASy. Bioinformatic analysis of IRX1 with the NetPhos tool predicted 71 potential phosphorylation sites throughout the protein.

Protein Interactions 
Potential protein interacting partners for IRX1 were found using computational tools. The STRING database lists nine putative interacting partners supported by text mining evidence, though closer analysis of the results shows little support for most of these predicted interactions. However, it is possible that one of these proteins, CDKN1A, is involved in the predicted regulation of IRX1 by E2F cell cycle regulators.

Conservation

Orthologs 
IRX1 has a high degree of conservation across vertebrate and invertebrate species. The entire protein is more fully conserved through vertebrate species, while only the homeodomain and IRO motif are conserved in more distant homologs.
Homologous sequences were found in species as distantly related to humans as the pig roundworm Ascaris suum, from the family Ascarididae, using BLAST and the ALIGN tool through the San Diego Super Computer Biology Workbench. The following is a table describing the evolutionary conservation of IRX1.

Paralogs 
IRX1 is one of six members of the Iroquois-class homeodomain proteins found in humans: IRX2, IRX3, IRX4, IRX5, and IRX6. IRX1, IRX2, and IRX4 are found on human chromosome 5, and their orientation corresponds to that of IRX3, IRX5, and IRX6 found on human chromosome 16. It is thought that the genomic organization of IRO genes in conserved gene clusters allows for coregulation and enhancer sharing during development.

References

Further reading